David Asper  (born November 26, 1958) is a Canadian lawyer and businessman, currently serving as Acting Dean of Robson Hall, the law faculty of the University of Manitoba. Asper is the son of Canwest founder Izzy Asper, and is now the head of his family's namesake charitable foundation. As a lawyer, he served on David Milgaard's legal team that overturned his wrongful conviction and later became a professor. From April 2017 to December 2018, he served as chair of the Winnipeg Police Board, and in January 2019 became chair of the Manitoba Police Commission.

Early life and education
Asper was born in Winnipeg in 1958 to Izzy Asper, the founder of Canwest, and Babs Asper (1933–2011). He has two younger siblings, Gail Asper and Leonard Asper.

After graduating from Brentwood College School on Vancouver Island Asper attended the University of Manitoba where he earned a BA in political science and history. He then went to California Western School of Law, earning a Juris Doctor in 1984.

Career
Asper started his career as a lawyer focused primarily on criminal defense litigation and successfully represented David Milgaard in overturning one of Canada's most notorious wrongful conviction cases. In 2006 he returned to Law School at the University of Toronto where he earned an LLM in 2007.

Following completion of his master's degree in law at the University of Toronto in 2007, Asper served as assistant professor of law at the University of Manitoba Robson Hall Faculty of Law. He continues to teach as an adjunct professor at Lakehead University's Bora Laskin School of Law and at Arizona State University Sandra Day O'Connor College of Law, and comments occasionally on legal matters for popular media. Asper has also served on various committees of the Law Society of Manitoba and is a learning resource for the CPLED Articling module on ethics and professional responsibility.

In 2013 Asper was a co-founder of Amenity Healthcare Limited, which owned and operated a chain of independent pharmacies in Western Canada, typically in traditionally underserved communities. It grew at a rate of seven to ten pharmacies per year before its acquisition in 2017 by TorQuest Partners, a Toronto-based equity firm.

He is also chair of Creswin Properties Ltd, a private real estate investment firm and an investor through the Manitoba Technology Accelerator program, where he serves on the boards of Cubresa Inc. and Arterial Stiffness Inc., which are developing leading-edge life science technologies. He has also invested in the Broadway revival of the Tony Award-winning musical Pippin, a London-based critically acclaimed and award-winning revival of The Scottsboro Boys and the forthcoming Broadway revival of On the Town. Previously Asper served as chair of the National Post newspaper and in various executive or governance positions at Canwest Media in Canada, Australia, New Zealand and the United Kingdom.

In April 2017, Asper was named by Winnipeg mayor Brian Bowman to be the chair of the Winnipeg Police Board. Upon his confirmation by the city council the same month, he became the board head not to be an elected official.

He became acting dean of Robson Hall on July 1, 2020, having previously served as a faculty member from 2009 to 2013. He has also taught law as an adjunct professor at the Bora Laskin Faculty of Law and the Sandra Day O'Connor College of Law.

Philanthropy
In philanthropy and public service, in addition to being chair of The Asper Foundation, Asper is a past chair and current director of the Winnipeg Blue Bombers, member of the Board of the Pan Am Clinic Foundation and co-chair of the 2015 CFL Grey Cup Festival Committee. Through his philanthropy Asper provided the lead gift to establish the David Asper Centre for Constitutional Rights at the University of Toronto. He has also established major endowments at the University of Manitoba, United Way and the Jewish Foundation of Manitoba where he actively supports the Jewish Child and Family Services Helping Hand Initiative.

Past community involvement includes president of the Winnipeg Folk Festival, chairman of the Winnipeg Blue Bombers, vice-chair of the Canadian Football League board of governors, co-chair of the 2006 Winnipeg Grey Cup Festival, governor and vice-chair at St. John's-Ravenscourt School, member of the University of Toronto governing council, member of the board of the Canadian Friends of the Simon Wiesenthal Centre.

In October 2018, Asper and his family donated 2.5 million dollars to the Canadian Olympic Foundation's 5to8 athlete development campaign, the largest donation to Canadian Olympic sport by a factor of ten.

Asper endorsed Stephen Harper for prime minister and is associated and supports the Conservative Party of Canada

Awards and honours 
Asper also received the Arbour Award from the University of Toronto and the Award of Distinction from Destination Winnipeg. He was a recipient of the Queen Elizabeth II Diamond Jubilee Medal in recognition of his community service. In 2019 he was appointed as Queen's Counsel in the Province of Manitoba.

Personal life 
David Asper is married to Ruth. Together, they have three adult children: Daniel, Rebecca, and Max.

External links 
 The Asper Foundation

References 

1958 births
David
Living people
Canadian television executives
Lawyers in Manitoba
Jewish Canadian philanthropists
University of Toronto alumni
University of Toronto Faculty of Law alumni
California Western School of Law alumni